Bernhard Auerswald (1818–1870) was a German mycologist and professor from Leipzig. He participated as chief correspondent of botany, sending specimens that his colleague Heinrich Moritz Willkomm collected and sent to him from his expeditions.

Published works 
 Botanische Unterhaltungen zum Verständniss der heimathlichen Flora. Leipzig: H. Mendelssohn, 1858
 Anleitung zum rationellen Botanisiren. Leipzig: Veit & Comp., 1860
 Unsere Heimats-Kräuter als Hausmittel : eine ausführliche Beschreibung aller heilwirkenden Pflanzen und Kräuter deren Fundort, praktische Verwendung und Verwertung in den verschiedensten Krankheitsfällen des menschlichen Lebens. Nach den neuesten und besten Quellen bearbeitet. Dresden 1860
 Pyrenomycetes novi ex herbario Heufleriano. Wien: C. Ueberreuter, 1868
 Pyrenomycetum aliquot novae species tirolenses. 1868
 Synopsis Pyrenomycetum europaeorum. Dresden: Heinrich 1869

The abbreviation Auersw. is used when citing Auerswald as the author in scientific classification of vegetables.

References

19th-century German botanists
German mycologists
1818 births
1870 deaths
Scientists from Leipzig